Mario Eduardo Cuenca (born 6 March 1975, in Del Campillo Córdoba Province) is an Argentine football goalkeeper, most recently playing for Arsenal de Sarandí in the Primera División Argentina.

Club career
Cuenca started his career with Talleres de Córdoba in 1995. He was part of the team that won the Primera B Nacional in the 1997-1998 season, winning promotion to the Primera División. In 1999, he was again part of the Talleres team that won the Copa CONMEBOL, the only international title in the club's history.

In 2002 Cuenca moved to Racing Club de Avellaneda, and in 2006 he moved to Arsenal where he established himself as the first team goalkeeper. On November 14, 2007 he had a good performance against River Plate in the semi-finals of the Copa Sudamericana 2007. He made a number of saves during the game, saved two penalties in the penalty shootout and scored the winning penalty, to send Arsenal to their first ever major final.

Honours

External links
 Argentine Primera statistics at Futbol XXI
Mario Cuenca at Football Lineups

1975 births
Living people
Sportspeople from Córdoba Province, Argentina
Argentine footballers
Association football goalkeepers
Talleres de Córdoba footballers
Racing Club de Avellaneda footballers
Arsenal de Sarandí footballers